The cycling competition at the 2021 Southeast Asian Games took place in Hòa Bình, Vietnam from 14 to 17 May 2022 (mountain biking) and 19 to 22 May 2022 (road cycling). Only mountain biking and road race were featured in this edition.

Medal table

Medalists

Mountain biking

Road cycling

References

External links
  

2021 Southeast Asian Games events
2021
Southeast Asian Games